Reer Faqay, also known as Banu Qahtan, is a Somali clan and a Benadiri sub clan. It is primarily found in the southern coastal cities of Mogadishu, Marka, Baraawe and Kismayo. They established communities in the hinterlands in towns such as Afgooye, Baidoa, Diinsoor and Bardheere.

Etymology 
The name Faqi comes from the Arabic fiqh (Islamic jurisprudence).

Culture 
The Reer Faqi lineage in a Banaadiri context are inheritors of the role of Qadis. In Mogadishu the chief and several cities of actual Somalia Qadi was chosen from this clan. This is not the case in other Benadiri settlements.

Due to their role in Banaadiri society, especially in Mogadishu, Merca, Baraawa, Kisimaayo, Luuq and other cities in Somalia, the Reer Faqis must be seen as impartial. As a result, the Reer Faqi clan are not seen as either Reer Shingani or Reer Hamar Weyne (Mogadishu's oldest settlements) like other Banaadiri Mogadishu clans. They are one of the only groups who can be found in both moieties (this also includes the clan confederacy Reer Maanyo). Reer Faqi are also not part of any Sufi brotherhood and do not take part in Mogadishu's annual Banaadiri festival "shirta".

The Reer Faqi are one of the oldest communities and the one of the first who arrived in the territory of East Africa and in the actual territory of Somalia. Their ancestors were from Yemen originally. The longest presence of Arab communities is proved by the Mosque of al Jama'a and the one of Fakhrudin in Mogadiscio, Somalia. The Jama'a Mosque was built in 636 AH (1238CE).

Clan tree 
A summarized clan family tree of the major Benadiri subclan of Reer Faqi is presented below:

Reer Faqi
 Musharaf Haaji
 Abubakar 
 Uthman
 Muallim Umar
 Shqaali (Shaykh Ali)
 Abakar
 Ahmed
Aw Abdalla
Muallim Umar
Muallim Sadaaq
Muallim Mukarram
Cabdinuur

 Aba Haaji
Faqi Abubakar
Faqi Ahmed
Muallim Usman
 Faqi Elmi
 Faqi Asharow Faqi Elmi
Al Faqi Jamal
Shaykh Wali
 Abubakar Faqi Elmi
 Sadik
 Omar
 Osman
 Ali
 Faqi Ahmed Faqi Elmi
 Sheikh Mohamed
 Nur
 Abdurrahman
 Ikar
 Omar
 Haji Abdinur
 Abubakar
 Mayani
 Aqil
 Abatey
Some lineages may have been left out.

Notable people 

 Aw Faqi Aboor – a religious ancestor of clan Reer Faqi
 Shaykh Muhiyidin Mua'llim Mukaram – a religious ancestor and expert of Islamic Fiqh of clan Reer Faqi
 Yahya Sadiq Omar – a politician and one of the most important of clan Reer Faqi representative in Somalia - 
 Sheikh Mohammad Yahya Aladiin Moalim Mukaram
 Haji Ahmed Mao Ahmed "ABAGAASI"- Former Secretary Office of the Somali President the late Mohamed Siad Barre. Somali Diplomat in Paris, France.
 Ikar Amin Ikar - Former Deputy Mayor of Mogadishu, Somali Democratic Republic
 Dr Mohamed Abdulkadir Mohamed - Former Deputy Governor Benadir Region/Deputy Mayor of Mogadishu, Somali Federal Republic. Also Chief of the Reer Faqi Clan
 Mohamed Bin Ali "UUNSANE" - Historian and Former Chief of the Reer Faqi Clan
 Khalid Macow – current representative of the Reer Faqi clan in the lower house of the Somali federal government
 Sharif Mohamed Saydi – former representative of the Reer Faqi clan in the lower house of the Somali federal government
 Dr Ali Mungana Maye, a senior urology surgeon, who was one of the few specialists before the start of civil war.
 Dr Maye Abu Omar, University Professor and international consultant  in Health. Former senior civil servant at the Ministry of Health prior to civil war  
 Dr Abubakar Mohamed Buho, was specialist of neuro-psychiatry. The only one on  Somalia until the beginning of civil war

See also 

 Banaadiri people
 Shanshiyo
 Biido
 Haatim
 Asharaf
 12 Koofi
 Bravenese people

References 

 5- Banaadir, un popolo e un'identità negata a cura di Mohamed Abbas Sufi - edit by Africa e Mediterraneo - Italy
 6- The renewal of a millenary identity Nuredin Hagi Scikei - edit by Clueb Italy

Ethnic groups in Somalia